Charles Reese may refer to:
 Charles Reese (politician), member of the Mississippi House of Representatives
 Charles Lee Reese, American chemist

See also
 Charley Reese, American syndicated columnist